The Corales Puntacana Championship is a golf tournament in the Dominican Republic on the PGA Tour, formerly on the Web.com Tour. It was first played in 2016 at the Puntacana Resort and Club, on the east coast in the   province.

After two years as a Web.com Tour event, it transitioned to a PGA Tour alternate event (opposite the WGC Match Play in Texas), starting in March  The first PGA Tour event held in the Dominican Republic, it is similar in rewards to other alternate events: 300 FedEx Cup points for the winner, a two-year tour exemption, 24 OWGR points, but no invitation to the Masters Tournament.

The inaugural event in 2016 was held in early June, then moved to early May in 2017.

Because of the COVID-19 pandemic, the 2020 tournament was postponed until September when it was part of the 2020–21 PGA Tour season. It was also elevated to full FedEx Cup point event status, with the winner receiving a 2021 Masters Tournament invitation.

Winners

Notes

References

External links

Coverage on the PGA Tour's official site

PGA Tour events
Former Korn Ferry Tour events
Golf tournaments in the Dominican Republic
Sport in La Altagracia Province
Recurring sporting events established in 2016
2016 establishments in the Dominican Republic